The three teams in this group played against each other on a home-and-away basis. The group winner West Germany qualified for the fifth FIFA World Cup held in Switzerland.
Dates : 24/6/1953-28/3/1954

Group 1

Norway vs Saarland

Norway vs West Germany

West Germany vs Saarland

Saarland vs Norway

West Germany vs Norway

Saarland vs West Germany

(*) shortly after half time

(**) after a handball by Erich Schanko

Team stats

Head coach:  Sepp Herberger

Head coach:  Helmut Schön

Head coach:  Willibald Hahn

External links
FIFA official page
RSSSF - 1954 World Cup Qualification
Allworldcup

1954 FIFA World Cup qualification (European groups)
Qual
1953 in Norwegian football